Michael Kaan is a Canadian writer, whose debut novel The Water Beetles was published in 2017. The novel, a family saga about a young boy's experience during the Japanese invasion of Hong Kong, was based in part on Kaan's father's memoirs.

Life
Kaan, the child of a father from Hong Kong and a Canadian mother, was born in Winnipeg, Manitoba. He completed a degree in English from the University of Manitoba, later completing an MBA in Health Economics from the same institution. He has worked as a healthcare administrator since 2000, primarily in mental health and health research.

Work
The Water Beetles was shortlisted for the Governor General's Award for English-language fiction at the 2017 Governor General's Awards, and won the 2018 amazon.ca First Novel Award, the Margaret Laurence Prize for Fiction, and the McNally Robinson Book of the Year Prize.

References

21st-century Canadian novelists
Canadian male novelists
Canadian people of Hong Kong descent
Canadian writers of Asian descent
Writers from Winnipeg
Living people
21st-century Canadian male writers
Year of birth missing (living people)
Amazon.ca First Novel Award winners